Thali is a platter and a type of meal in South Asia.

Thali may also refer to:
Puja thali, in Hindu rituals
Thali (percussion), a musical instrument of Indian folk music
 Mangala sutra, or thali, a necklace used in the Hindu wedding ritual
 Thali dialect, a Saraiki dialect of Pakistan
 Thali, a dialect of the Marwari language of India
 Thali, a locality in Daanchhi, Kageshwari-Manohara Municipality, Kathmandu District, Nepal

See also 
 Thaali (disambiguation)
 Thallus, pl. thalli, the plant body of algae and lichens
 Thally, a village in Tamil Nadu, India
Thalli (State Assembly Constituency)
 Tahli (disambiguation)